The Jewish Children's Museum is the largest Jewish-themed children's museum in the United States. It aims for children of all faiths and backgrounds to gain a positive perspective and awareness of the Jewish heritage, fostering tolerance and understanding. The permanent collection features exhibits designed to be both educational and entertaining to children, often employing interactive multimedia. At the miniature golf course on the roof, for example, each hole represents a stage in Jewish life.

The museum is located in the Chabad-Lubavitch Chasidic community of Crown Heights  at 792 Eastern Parkway, Brooklyn, New York, near 770 Eastern Parkway, the headquarters of the Lubavitch movement. Built by architect, Steve H. Wilkowski of Milagros PM, the museum opened in 2004. In 2005, the Museum was among 406 New York City arts and social service institutions to receive part of a $20 million grant from the Carnegie Corporation, which was made possible through a donation by New York City mayor Michael Bloomberg.

History
In response to the infamous Crown Heights Riot in 1991 and the terrorist killing of 16-year-old yeshiva student Ari Halberstam on the Brooklyn Bridge in 1994, the Museum was built to create a teaching tool for local children to better understand their neighbors.

Planning for the exhibit content was done with the input of various religious and secular educators, with the final word being made by the Museum's Orthodox Jewish directorate.

Community activist Devorah Halberstam, mother of Ari, played a major role in the Museum's creation. The Museum is officially dedicated to Ari's memory.

The front of the Museum displays a giant collage of pictures of children. When viewed from a distance they form one giant picture of a child.

Details
 The Jewish Children's Museum was designed by Gwathmey, Siegel and Associates Architects.
 The cost of construction has been $35 million thus far, with an additional $5 million projected after the completion of the fourth floor exhibits (expected summer of 2011).
 The museum won the Building Brooklyn Award in 2006 for its design and social impact on the greater Brooklyn community. 
 More than 250,000 visitors came to the JCM in its first year of operation
 In addition to its computerized and interactive exhibits, the JCM building includes a Kosher restaurant, Kosher cafe, gift shop, social hall, 100-seat theater, gameshow studio, arts and crafts center and computer rooms.

References

External links

2004 in Judaism
Chabad organizations
Children's museums in New York City
Crown Heights, Brooklyn
Hasidic Judaism in New York City
Jewish museums in New York City
Jewish youth organizations
Museums in Brooklyn
Chabad in the United States